Skylight Films was a division of ABS-CBN Films that specialized in producing films for the niche market. Its first feature film was the 2012 comedy romance My Cactus Heart, which was followed by other films (see Filmography) until 2017.

With the consolidation of the operations of ABS-CBN's film arm (ABS-CBN Films) and the creation of Black Sheep Productions in 2018, Skylight Films ceased operations.

Filmography

References

External links

Film production companies of the Philippines
Philippine film studios
Companies established in 2012
Companies based in Quezon City
Star Cinema
Assets owned by ABS-CBN Corporation